Glenea andrewesi is a species of beetle in the family Cerambycidae. It was described by Charles Joseph Gahan in 1893. It is known from India.

References

andrewesi
Beetles described in 1893